Cixius nervosus is a species of planthoppers in the tribe Cixiini.

Subspecies
 Cixius nervosus longispinus Wagner, 1955 
 Cixius nervosus nervosus (Linnaeus, 1758) 
 Cixius nervosus obscurus China, 1942

Description
These large planthoppers show three keels on the scutellum. The front wings are transparent, with two dark brown band and faint brown markings posteriorly. Dark spots there are along the costal margin and smaller spots on veins.

Adults can be found from May to October.

Distribution
This widespread species is present in most of Europe, the East Palearctic realm, and the Nearctic realm.

Habitat
These common planthoppers  live on deciduous trees, on hedge rows and in meadows and scrublands.

References 

Cixiini
Hemiptera of Europe
Insects described in 1758
Taxa named by Carl Linnaeus